The International Association of Volcanology and Chemistry of the Earth's Interior (IAVCEI) is a learned society that focuses on research in volcanology, efforts to mitigate volcanic disasters, and research into closely related disciplines, such as igneous geochemistry and petrology, geochronology, volcanogenic mineral deposits, and the physics of the generation and ascent of magmas in the upper mantle and crust. It is one of eight constituent associations of the International Union of Geodesy and Geophysics (IUGG).

IAVCEI is run by an executive committee whose membership changes every four years. The Executive determines policies for the Association, enacting them through a series of commissions and task groups. Bulletin of Volcanology is the journal of IAVCEI.

History
The International Union of Geodesy and Geophysics, a non-governmental organisation, was established in 1919. The Volcanology section of the IUGG, also founded in 1919, was the forerunner of the IAVCEI. It was formally constituted at the First General Assembly of the IUGG (Rome, 1922). The name was changed to International Association of Volcanology (IAV) at the Fourth General Assembly of the IUGG (Stockholm, 1930). IAV statutes and by-laws were adopted in Helsinki in 1960 and were revised in Zurich in 1967 and in Canberra in 1979. The association's present name was adopted in 1967 in order to harmonise with the name of the International Association of Seismology and the Physics of the Earth's Interior (IASPEI).

IAVCEI statutes and objectives
The statutes of IAVCEI include four objectives:

To study scientific problems related to volcanoes and volcanic processes, past and present, and to the chemistry of the Earth's interior.
To encourage, initiate and coordinate research, and promote international cooperation in these studies.
To encourage volcanologists to alert appropriate authorities about the importance of adequate surveillance of active and potentially active volcanoes, and of volcanic risk assessment.
To arrange for the discussion and publication of the results of scientific research on volcanology and on the chemistry of the Earth's interior.

Countries are members of IUGG. After 1996 individuals have been able to become members of IAVCEI.

Publications
The Bulletin of Volcanology is the journal of IAVCEI. It is a continuation of the Bulletin Volcanologique, which began publication in 1922.

The association has published 22 volumes of the Catalogue of the Active Volcanoes of the World. The Catalogue was announced in 1924, and was begun in 1948 when the regional arrangement and format were established. The first volume, on Indonesia, was published in 1951, and the 22nd volume, on New Zealand, in 1967.

Awards
Thorarinsson Medal, in honor of Sigurdur Thorarinsson (1912–1983)
Wager Medal, in honor of Lawrence Wager (1904–1965)
Fisher Medal, in honor of Richard V. Fisher (1928-2002)
Krafft Medal, in honor of Katia Krafft (1942–1991) and Maurice Krafft (1946–1991)
George Walker Awards, in honor of George P. L. Walker (1926–2005)
Honorary Membership

Wager medal
The Wager medal is named for Professor Lawrence Wager of the University of Oxford, who died in 1965. The medal is given every two years to a 'mid-career' scientist, within 15 years of completion of their PhD. The award recognises individuals who  have made outstanding contributions to volcanology, particularly in the eight-year period prior to the Award.

Wager Medallists
1974 Franco Barberi
1974 J. Varet 
1978 Steve Sparks
1987 Charlie Bacon 
1993 Colin Wilson 
1993 Claude Jaupart 
1998 Giovanni Macedonio 
1998 Jon Davidson 
2002 Andrew Woods 
2002 James Gardner 
2004 Andy Harris 
2004 Oleg Melnik 
2008 Joachim Gottsmann 
2008 Alessandro Aiuppa 
2011 Amanda Clarke 
2013 Antonio Costa 
2013 Fidel Costa 
2015 Tommaso Esposti Ongaro
2015 Mattia de’ Michieli Vitturi 
2017 Marie Edmonds 
2017 Yan Lavallée 
2019 Madeleine Humphreys
2023 Susanna Jenkins
2023 Yves Moussallam

Fisher medal
The Fisher Medal is named for Richard V. Fisher of the University of California Santa Barbara, who died in 2002, in Santa Barbara, California. The medal is given every 4 years to a scientist who has made outstanding contributions to volcanology based primarily upon field observations.

Fisher medallists
2017 José Luis Macias Vasquez

Krafft medal
The Krafft Medal is named for Katia and Maurice Krafft who were killed while filming on Mount Unzen, Japan in 1991. The Krafft Medal is awarded every 4 years to an individual who has made outstanding contributions to volcanology through service to the scientific community or to communities threatened by volcanic activity.

Krafft medallists
2004 Tom Simkin 
2008 Christopher G. Newhall
2013 Shigeo Aramaki 
2017 Hugo Delgado Granados 
2017 Marta Calvache

George Walker award
The George Walker award is named for  GPL Walker, who died in 2005. The award is given every two years to a scientist who is within 7 years of Ph.D. completion, and recognizes the achievements of a recent outstanding graduate in volcanology, or a recent graduate whose achievements in volcanology involved operating in difficult circumstances. 

George Walker awardees
2004 Costanza Bonadonna
2008 Diana C. Roman 
2008 Fukashi Maeno
2011 Josef Dufek 
2013 Heather Wright
2015 Anja Schmidt 
2017 Sébastien Biass
2017 Alexa Van Eaton
2019 Damien Gaudin
2019 Fabian Wadsworth
2023 Emma Nicholson
2023 Andrea Bevilacqua

Honorary members
Honorary Membership is bestowed on individuals who have made outstanding contributions to the volcanological community, and IAVCEI.
 
Honorary Members
2003 Hans-Ulrich Schmincke
2003 Shigeo Aramaki
2003 Robert Tilling
2008 Haraldur Sigurdsson
2008 Franco Barberi
2008 Wally Johnson
2013 Servando de la Cruz Reyna
2013 Sergei Fedotov
2013 Grant Heiken
2013 Izumi Yokoyama
2023 Ray Cas
2023 Marta Calvache
2023 Lionel Wilson
2023 Patty Mothes

See also
 Volcano Number - a system developed for the Catalogue of the Active Volcanoes of the World

References

External links 
 

Volcanology
Geology organizations
Scientific organizations established in 1922